Anna Bitieva (also spelled Bitiyeva, born 17 November 1987) was an Azerbaijani group rhythmic gymnast. She represents her nation at international competitions.

She participated at the 2008 Summer Olympics in Beijing. She also competed at world championships, including at the 2005 and 2007 World Rhythmic Gymnastics Championships.

References

External links 
http://www.gymmedia.com/rhythmic-gymnastics/Bitieva-and-Gorodova-won-Portimao
https://www.olympic.org/beijing-2008/gymnastics-rhythmic/group-competition-women

1987 births
Living people
Azerbaijani rhythmic gymnasts
Place of birth missing (living people)
Gymnasts at the 2008 Summer Olympics
Olympic gymnasts of Azerbaijan
21st-century Azerbaijani women